Howard Newman is an American painter, sculptor, art restorer, and inventor.

Biography 
Howard Newman was born in Elizabeth, NJ, in 1943. He received a BA from Miami University of Ohio, where he studied architecture, Cultural Anthropology, Sociology and Classical Literature. After graduating from Miami University, Newman and his wife Mary entered Peace Corps training in a Special Forces training camp in Arecibo, Puerto Rico, where the two learned fluent Spanish and Survival Training. In 1967, Newman was accepted to the Rhode Island School of Design (RISD). In 1969 he received a BFA in Industrial Design and an MFA in Sculpture with a concentration in Silversmithing under the mentorship of master metalsmith John Prip.

Newman was awarded a Fulbright Scholarship to Italy in 1961; he and his wife Mary resided in Impruneta, south of Florence. There, Newman began making bronze sculptures.  In 1973 and 1974, Newman and his wife gave birth to their children, Joshua A.C. Newman and Rachel Newman-Greene.
Newman and his wife returned to Italy for another year between 1985 and 1986 and lived in Pietrasanta, north of Pisa, where he worked in La Fonderia Mariani, creating a series of bronzes, including two now on the grounds of the Newport Art Museum.

As of 2016, Newman continues to work at his private studio located in Newport, Rhode Island.

Restoration 

Currently, Newman and his staff restore a wide range of art objects made of mixed materials, including silver, gold, bronze, tin, iron and zinc. Newman spent a decade working on projects for the Preservation Society of Newport County. He exhibited some of those restorations at the Century Association in New York City in the year 2000. Newmans’ company is responsible for the restoration of Brown University's John Hay Library collection of marble busts.

Restoration of "The Trinity" 
In 2008, Newman and his company undertook the restoration of The Trinity Crucifix, the centerpiece of The Church of St. Gregory the Great on the campus of Portsmouth Abbey. The Trinity was crafted by American sculptor Richard Lippold in the 1960s, consisting of a 22,000-foot web of gold-plated brass wire. The wires radiate from the hands of the cross above the head, suspending the crucifix ten feet above the altar. The artisans from Newmans Ltd. carefully untangled the deteriorating wire, and restrung the five miles of wire into the original configuration, along with the restored crucifix.

The restoration project received a 2009 Rhody Award for Historic Preservation by the Rhode Island Historical Preservation & Heritage Commission and 2009 Honor Award for Historic Preservation from the American Institute of Architects of Rhode Island.

Inventions 
In 2011, in partnership with Len Katzman, Howard Newman started Sigma Surfacing LLC, an intellectual properties venture. He presently holds several patents pending.

Fine art

Restorations

Inventions

Awards
 Marshall Scholarship
 Fulbright Scholarship, 1961
 Louis Comfort Tiffany Foundation Fellowship, 1978
 American Academy of Arts and Letters Award, 1980
 American Academy in Rome Rome Prize, 1980
 AIA Connecticut Design Award Preservation Honor, 2013

References

External links

ncarchitects.com
sigmasurfacing.com
finemetalrestoration.com
YouTube

Artists from Rhode Island
Contemporary sculptors
Conservator-restorers
Rhode Island School of Design alumni
Living people
Year of birth missing (living people)